Henrik Eriksson,  (born 4 February, 1974), is a Swedish former cross-country skier. When it came to club competitions, he competed for IFK Mora SK.
Competing at elite level between 1994 and 2006, he participated at Vasaloppet several times, winning the event in 2001. In Vasaloppet 2002, he ended up ninth and Vasaloppet in 2004 he ended up tenth.

Cross-country skiing results
All results are sourced from the International Ski Federation (FIS).

World Cup

Season standings

References

External links

1974 births
Swedish male cross-country skiers
Vasaloppet winners
Living people
IFK Mora skiers